Stanislava Brezovar (7 November 1937 – 18 December 2003), married name Kleiber, was a  Slovenian ballerina.  She was also known as Stanka Brezovar.

Born in Zagorje ob Savi, Slovenia, she studied to be a Germanist, but her primary love was ballet.  She studied ballet in Düsseldorf.  It was there that she met and married the German-born Austrian conductor Carlos Kleiber.  

In 1955, at the age of 18, she starred in the movie Ples čarovnic (Dance Of The Witches), a Triglav Film production in Slovenian. The movie was a tour-de-force, 452 minutes of ballet to the Ples čarovnic symphonic poem by Blaž Arnič with choreography by Pia and
Pino Mlakar.

Brezovar is buried together with Carlos Kleiber in the Slovenian village of Konjšica near Litija.  She was survived by a son, Marko, and a daughter, Lillian.

References

This article is based in part on material from the Slovenian Wikipedia.

External links
 "Stanislava Brezovar Kleiber" brief biography from her hometown webpage in Slovenian;

Slovenian ballerinas
1937 births
2003 deaths
People from Zagorje ob Savi